Patrick Matibini (born 20 July 1959) is a Zambian politician, lawyer and former judge. He has been Speaker of the National Assembly from 6 October 2011 until 3 September 2021.

Career
Matibini was born on 20 July 1959. He studied at the University of Zambia, where he obtained both a Bachelor and master's degree in Law and subsequently a PhD. Matibini has worked as a law professor at the university since 1993. He is a lawyer by profession.

In 2002 Matibini worked with the Zambia Independent Media Association to draft three bills for the National Assembly, these being the Freedom of Information Bill, Independent Broadcasting Authority Bill, and Broadcasting Bill. In 2006 he published a book titled "The Struggle for Media Law Reforms in Zambia".

Matibini was a judge at the High Court of Zambia. He was made a State Counsel by President Rupiah Banda in 2009.

Political career
The Patriotic Front (PF) nominated Matibini as Speaker of the National Assembly in October 2011. Zambian President Michael Sata appealed to MPs to accept Matibini and Mkhondo Lungu as Deputy Speaker, in return the PF would support a Movement for Multi-Party Democracy (MMD) candidate for Chairperson for Committees. On 6 October Matibini received 78 votes, and opposition candidate Richard Kapita received 77 votes. Matibini was subsequently installed as President of the National Assembly. He succeeded Amusaa Mwanamwambwa. On 23 September 2016 Matibini was re-elected as Speaker, having run for the position unopposed.

On 13 June 2017, under Matibini's leadership, 48 MPs of the opposition United Party for National Development were suspended from the National Assembly for thirty days. Matibini accused them of "gross misconduct" after they did not attend the speech of the nation address of President Edgar Lungu in March. Matibini called upon the MPs to resign.

Personal life
Matibini is married.

References

1959 births
Living people
Speakers of the National Assembly of Zambia
University of Zambia alumni
Academic staff of the University of Zambia
20th-century Zambian judges
Zambian State Counsel